Garcinia bifasciculata is a species of flowering plant in the family Clusiaceae. It is found only in Tanzania. It is threatened by habitat loss.

References

Endemic flora of Tanzania
Critically endangered flora of Africa
bifasciculata
Taxonomy articles created by Polbot